Glenn Stephen Poole (born 3 February 1981) is an English footballer and player-coach for Grays Athletic in the Isthmian League North Division.

Career
Poole, a left winger who can also play in central midfield, started his career as a junior at Tottenham Hotspur. He was not offered a professional deal at White Hart Lane and after being released he joined Yeovil Town. Poole failed to establish himself at Huish Park and, after a loan spell at Bath City, he dropped further down inton non-League to sign for Ford United (who went on to change their name to Redbridge). His impressive goalscoring record at Ford (averaging over one goal every three games from midfield) caught the attention of Conference South side Thurrock whom he signed for in July 2004. After a season at Thurrock, he then moved to their local rivals Grays Athletic, in 2005. Poole played 75 league games for Grays, scoring 19 goals in the process. He also scored one of the goals as Grays won the 2005–06 FA Trophy Final.

Poole was signed by new Brentford manager Terry Butcher on 19 May 2007 on a free transfer in a two-year deal. Brentford beat off competition from several other clubs for Poole's signature. He had a very successful first season, ending as Brentford's top goalscorer, despite playing in midfield. In addition, his volley against Wycombe Wanderers on Boxing day 2007 earned Poole the "Goal of the Season" award.

His second season at Brentford was less successful, as he lost his place in the team to Sam Wood from December 2008. Poole was released at the end of the 2008–09 season.

On 12 January 2010, Poole signed for AFC Wimbledon until the end of the 2009–10 season. He was released by AFC Wimbledon at the end of the season. He signed for League Two club Barnet on 14 June 2010 and scored on his debut at Chesterfield on the opening day of the season. Poole was released by Barnet on 31 January 2011, and subsequently joined Conference South club Braintree Town on 3 February 2011. However, he left the club on 30 June after, turning down a new contract offer, and rejoined Thurrock for the start of the 2011–12 season.

He signed for Billericay Town in December 2011. Here he claimed another trophy as Billericay won the Isthmian League Premier Division that season. He had a more central role for the club in midfield. He scored six goals in 22 appearances in the 2011–12 season for Billericay Town. In the 2013–14 campaign, after the transfer of Rob Swaine to Bromley, Poole became the captain of Billericay. He left Billericay in the summer of 2015 and joined local rivals Canvey Island, making 30 appearances in all competitions before leaving in December 2015.

Career statistics

Honours
Grays Athletic
FA Trophy: 2005–06

Brentford
League Two: 2008–09

Billericay Town
Isthmian League Premier Division: 2011–12

References

External links

1981 births
Living people
English footballers
Association football wingers
Player-coaches
Yeovil Town F.C. players
Bath City F.C. players
Redbridge F.C. players
Thurrock F.C. players
Grays Athletic F.C. players
Rochdale A.F.C. players
Brentford F.C. players
AFC Wimbledon players
Barnet F.C. players
Braintree Town F.C. players
Billericay Town F.C. players
Canvey Island F.C. players
English Football League players
National League (English football) players
Isthmian League players